Robert McAllister (January 9, 1876 – October 10, 1963) was a businessman and politician in New Brunswick, Canada. He represented St. John County in the Legislative Assembly of New Brunswick as a Conservative member from 1931 to 1960.

He was the son of James McAllister and Jessie Main, both of Scottish origin. In 1902, McAllister married a Miss Humphrey. He was a dyer and cleaner. McAllister served as county warden. He was a member of the Knights of Pythias. He was first elected to the provincial assembly in a 1931 by-election held after John M. Baxter was appointed a judge. He died in 1963 of arteriosclerosis.

References 

 Canadian Parliamentary Guide, 1948, PG Normandin

1876 births
1963 deaths
20th-century Canadian politicians
20th-century Canadian businesspeople
Businesspeople from Saint John, New Brunswick
Politicians from Saint John, New Brunswick
Progressive Conservative Party of New Brunswick MLAs